The 283 megawatt Gulf Wind Farm is located on the Texas Gulf Coast in Kenedy County. It is owned by the Pattern Energy Group which is based in San Francisco. Most of the wind farm’s output has been contracted under long-term power purchase agreements.

Hurricane Harvey
The Gulf Wind Farm was operational during most of Hurricane Harvey's landfall in Texas, with turbines only shutting down when winds reach , and returning to normal operation the next day.

See also

Wind power in Texas
List of wind farms

References

Buildings and structures in Kenedy County, Texas
Wind farms in Texas